The World Judo Cadets Championships are the highest level of international judo competition for juniors, 18 years of age or less. The championships are held every second year by the International Judo Federation, and qualified judoka compete in their respective categories as representatives of their countries. The last edition of the championships took place in Sarajevo, Bosnia and Herzegovina in 2022.

Competitions

Team competitions

References

 
Cadets
World Championships, Cadets
Judo, Cadets
Recurring sporting events established in 2009